Caryn Seamount is a seamount, or underwater volcano in the Atlantic Ocean. It is an independent seamount located southwest of the New England Seamounts, which was active more than 100 million years ago. It is in close proximity to Muir Seamount and the British island territory of Bermuda.

References

Seamounts of the Atlantic Ocean